KDE Image Plugin Interface (usually abbreviated to Kipi or KIPI) is an API that allows creation of application-independent image processing plugins in the KDE project.

Host applications 

 Digikam
 KPhotoAlbum (previously named KimDaBa)
 ShowImg
 Gwenview
 KSquirrel (since 0.7.0-pre1)

Plugins

Acquisition and management
 Acquire Images provides tools to capture new images and saves them to the collections.
 Kamera klient is a tool to connect the computer to a digital camera.
 Batch process.
 Find duplicates is a tool to find duplicate photographs on image collections.

Metadata/Time
 MetadataEdit.
 Time adjust is a tool for adjusting image files timestamp.

Transform/Convert
 JPEG loss less is a tool to transform the images without loss in quality due to compression.
 MPEG encoder is a tool for converting a series of images into a diashow-style MPEG file.
 RAW image converter, is a conversion tool for raw format images.

Export/Send

 Flickr export allows the user to upload photos to the Flickr web service.
 Gallery export is a tool for export image collections to a remote Gallery server.
 HTML export is a tool for exporting a set of albums to an HTML page.
 iPod export.
 MediaWiki export is a tool to upload images on any MediaWiki installation.
 Simpleviewer Export.
 Send images is a tool for sending images directly by e-mail.

Authoring
 Calendar is a tool to create calendar from image collections.
 Slide Show — plugin creates a full screen slideshow of the images.

Output
 CD archiving is a tool to back up image collections.
 Print wizard is a tool to print images at the same time.

Other
 GPS Sync.
 OpenGL Imageviewer is a tool which lets the user perform actions such as zooming or proceeding to the next image very fast.
 Wall paper is a tool to put an image as the desktop background.

References 

 

Extragear
KDE Platform